The Chilean Army is the land arm of the Chilean Armed Forces. This 80,000-person army (9,200 of which are conscripts) is organized into six divisions, a special operations brigade and an air brigade.

In recent years, and after several major re-equipment programs, the Chilean Army has become the most technologically advanced and professional army in Latin America.

The Chilean Army is mostly supplied with equipment from Germany, the Netherlands, Switzerland, Sweden, the United States, Israel, France, and Spain.

History

Colonial warfare

19th century

Independence War

The National Army of Chile was created on December 2, 1810, by order of the First National Government Junta. The army was actively involved in the second Independence War, which was fought against royalist troops in battles such as Chacabuco and Maipú or others. During this period, national figures such as Bernardo O'Higgins commanded the army and José de San Martín was allied with O’Higgins  . The Army's first commander-in-chief was José Miguel Carrera.
After obtaining independence from Spain, the newly formed Republic reorganized its military structure by creating the Military Academy of Chile, which was founded by General O'Higgins in 1817.

Guardia Nacional
Diego Portales set up a civil militia, the Guardia Nacional, to end one of the worst stages of militarism in Chilean history. The militia was created in 2005
. Portales developed this parallel army to compensate the army's might. The Chilean Conscription Law of 1900 marked the beginning of the end of the Guardia Nacional.

War of the Confederation

Occupation of Araucanía

War of the Pacific

Military emulation 1885–1914

During the War of the Pacific, many high-ranking officers won valuable insights into the state of the army and became aware that the army required rebuilding. Losses, material destruction, and organizational flaws regarding strategic planning and officer training, were noted by officers like Emilio Sotomayor and Patricio Lynch, who approached President Santa María arguing the need of good schools and technical departments for the military. Other factor that supported the emulation, the deliberate systematic imitation of the military technology, organisation, and doctrine of one country by another was the danger of war with Argentina. The emulation was backed by a broad coalition of civil and military leaders.

Chile hired a French military training mission in 1858, and the Chilean legation in Berlin was instructed to find a training mission during the War of the Pacific in 1881. But large-scale emulation of the Prussian Army began in 1886 with the appointment of Captain Emil Körner, a graduate of the renowned Kriegsakademie in Berlin. Also appointed were 36 Prussian officers to train officer cadets in the Chilean Military Academy. The training occurred in three phases; the first took place from 1885 to 1891 during the presidency of Domingo Santa María, the second was the post-civil-war phase, and the third was the 1906 reorganization.

The emulation was focused in armaments, conscription, officer recruitment and instruction, and general staff organization as well as military doctrine (adopted 1906). It was extended also into military logistics and medical services, promotions, retirement, salary regulation and even uniforms (adopted 1904), marching styles, helmets, parades, and military music.

Armaments: Prior to 1883, the army was equipped with a variety of rifles, mostly French and Belgian origin. From 1892 to 1902, the Chilean-Argentine Arms Race, marked the peak of Chilean arms purchase. 100,000 Mauser rifles and new Krupp artillery was bought for 3,000,000 DM in 1893, 2,000,000 DM in 1895 and 15,000,000 DM in 1898. Ammunition factories and small arms manufacturing plants were established.

Conscription: Like others armies in South America, Chile had had a small army of long-term service officers and soldiers. In 1900 Chile became the first country in Latin America to enforce a system of compulsory military service, whereby training, initially five to eighteen months (Germany: three years), took place in zones of divisional organization in order to create a solid military structure that could be easily doubled with well-trained and combat-ready reserve forces. Budgetary restrictions prevented the full impact of the law: the service fell disproportionately on the lower classes, no more than 20% of the contingent was incorporated annually, and former conscripts were not retrained periodically.

Officer education and training: The beginning of the German mission was dedicated almost exclusively to the organization and implementation of a standardized, technically oriented military education with the essence of Moltke's German military system of continuous study of artillery, infantry, cartography, history, topography, logistics, tactics, etc., for a modern, professional and technically trained officer corps. In 1886, the "Academia de Guerra" (War Academy) was founded "to elevate the level of technical and scientific instruction of army officers, in order that they be able, in case of war, to utilize the advantages of new methods of combat and new armaments." The best alumni were candidates for general staff service. By the mid-1890s Körner organized the courses for a Noncommissioned Officers' School (Escuela de Suboficiales y Clases).

During the 1891 Chilean Civil War Körner was removed from duty by José Manuel Balmaceda. He and his followers set sail north to join the Congressional forces in Iquique. He became chief architect of the new army and, though Estanislao del Canto formally was commander-in-chief, Körner led the rebel forces in the major clashes of the civil war.

Chile had had a General Staff during the War of the Pacific. Körner turned his attention to a permanent institution in 1893-94 that should replace the old "Inspector General del Ejército", but with control over military affairs in peacetime and wartime. It had four sections: Instruction and Discipline, Military Schools, Scientific Works (strategic and operational planning), and Administration.

20th century

Milicia Republicana
The Guardia Republicana or Milicia Republicana was created after the fall of the Socialist Republic of Chile in order to prevent another Coup d'Etat. On May 7, 20,000 militiamen marched past President Arturo Alessandri in the streets of Santiago. In Las Mercedes' plot, 1933, the Commander-in-Chief of the Army, Pedro Vignola called "to resist the Milicia Republicana by any means" and he was forced to retire from his post. In 1936, the militia was disbanded.

U.S. Influence

During the decades previous to the coup, the Chilean Army became influenced by the United States' anti-communist ideology in the context of various cooperation programs including the US Army School of the Americas.

The Army under General Pinochet

On 11 September 1973, in a watershed event of the Cold War and the history of Chile, president Salvador Allende was overthrown in a coup d’état by the Armed Forces. Paul W. Drake and Ivan Jaksic state in The Struggle for Democracy in Chile:
The armed forces killed, imprisoned, tortured, and exiled thousands of Chileans. The military suppressed, dismantled, and purged not only political parties but also publication, unions, schools, and other bastions of the democratic opposition. Even such privileged constituencies as university professors and students encountered serious limitations on their traditional ability to voice opinions of national, or even institutional relevance. ... The military regime viewed such activities [of the Catholic Church] with distrust, if not hostility. It launched a campaign of harassment against the Catholic Church ...
Once the military had demobilized the polity and society, the regime began implanting its vision of a new order. It set out to replace not only democratic with authoritarian politics but also statist with market-driven economics.

The Army, with now Captain General Augusto Pinochet, leader of the coup, as Commander-in-chief of both the Army and the Armed Forces, led the national mobilization effort in 1978 as the Beagle conflict began to hit the country. The Army was on full alert status during the duration of the crisis.

Patricio Aylwin became elected President of the Republic on December 14, 1989. Although Chile had officially become a democracy, the Chilean military remained highly powerful during the presidency of Aylwin, and the Constitution, amended by Pinochet's regime, ensured the continued influence of Pinochet and his commanders.

21st century
As a result of tensions with neighbors during the conflict-prone 1970s and early 1980s, the Chilean Army refined existing strategic concepts and eventually formulated a plan to restructure its forces.  Though wars were avoided, the threats from the 1970s and 1980s encouraged the army to address more effectively its major defense disadvantage: lack of strategic depth. Thus in the early 1980s it looked outward for a model of army organization that would best advance defensive capabilities by restructuring forces into smaller, more mobile units instead of traditional divisions.  The resulting Plan Alcázar envisions three military zones in Chile, with the bulk of forces concentrated in the north, and reinforces the center and south. The plan was implemented in stages, starting in 1994.  Thus Alcázar, based on threat scenarios of the past, is one of the most durable "lessons" of the past. Even with the resolution of almost all remaining territorial disputes, the restructuring agenda continued, reinforcing a conflict-based mindset in the army.

Peacekeeping

1964-2013 UNFICYP
1969 El Salvador-Honduras conflict (OAS mission).
1978-2013 UNIFIL
1989-1992 ONUCA
1991-1992 UNIKOM
1992-1993 UNTAC
1992-1995 ONUSAL
1995-1999 MOMEP (Military observer mission in the Cenepa War)
1996-1998 UNSCOM
1997-2002 UNMIBH
2000-2002 UNTAET
2000-2003 UNMOVIC
2000-(2013) UNMIK
2001-(2013) UNFICYP
2002-2003 UNMISET
2003-2006 DPKO
2003-(2013) MONUC
2003-2004 UNAMA
2004-(2013) EUFOR - ALTHEA
2004-(2013) MIFH (Multinational Interim Force for Haiti)
2004-(2013) MINUSTAH
2007-(2013) UNLOG (UN Logistics Base in Brindisi, Italy)

Organization

Order Of Battle
Army General Headquarters, in Santiago.

Land Operations Command, headquartered in Concepcion.
 1st Army Division: Regions II and III, with headquarters in Antofagasta.
 2nd Motorized Division: Regions IV, V, VI, VII and Santiago Metropolitan Region with headquarters in Santiago de Chile.
 3rd Mountain Division: Serving Regions VIII, IX, XIV, and X with headquarters in Valdivia.
 4th Army Division: Region XI with headquarters in Coyhaique.
 5th Army Division: Serving Region XII with headquarters in Punta Arenas.
 6th Army Division: Serving Regions I and XV, with headquarters in Iquique.
 Army Aviation Brigade: with headquarters in Rancagua (Brigada de Aviación del Ejército). It is the Army's aviation force, composed of 4 battalions and a logistics company.
 Lautaro Special Operations Brigade: with headquarters in Peldehue. It is the Army's special forces brigade, named after one of Chile's national heroes.

Training and Doctrine Command (Comando de Institutos y Doctrina)
 Army Schools' Division (División Escuelas)
 Army Education Division (División de Educación)
 Army Doctrine Division (División de Doctrina)

Force's Support Command (Comando de Apoyo de la Fuerza)

 Logistics Division, with headquarters in Santiago (División Logística del Ejército)
 Engineers Command
 Telecommunications Command
 Infrastructure Command
 Military Industry and Engineering Command

Army Independent Commands

 General Garrison Command in Santiago, serving the Santiago Metropolitan Region, reports directly to Army Headquarters
 Medical Command in Santiago
 Administration Command

Army General Staff (Estado Mayor General del Ejército)

 Chilean Military Mission to Washington
 Directorate of Intelligence
 Directorate of Operations
 Finance Directorate
 Logistics Directorate

Military equipment

The Chilean Army has acquired a number of new systems with the goal of having a completely modernized, and largely mechanized army by 2015. The military has also modified the operational structure, creating armoured brigades throughout the entire territory and a new special operations brigade, while preserving the current divisional scheme.

Personnel
In 2013, there were 3,900 officers, 17,300 NCOs, 3,600 professional soldiers, and 9,200 conscript soldiers. In military schools, 2,400 students. Civilian employees, 8,400.

Military ranks

Officers

Enlisted

Drill and traditions

The Chilean Army is famous for its elaborate drill, exhibited in large scale during the Día de las Glorias Navales on 21 May and the Parada Militar de Chile (Great Military Parade of Chile) on 19 September. The early armed forces adopted many Prussian military traditions, and it was during this period that the Chilean military had many of its most famous victories. As a result, the drill features many 19th and early 20th century Prussian and German patterns.

Participating soldiers wear stahlhelm and pickelhaube helmets and march in unaltered stechschritt. Marching music consists of Central European marches, alongside several local compositions. Each Parada Militar on 19 September ends with a playing of Preussischer Präsentiermarsch (first played in 2018) and Los viejos estandartes by a mounted band playing in the German tradition.

Pickelhaubes have been worn by the Military School and since recently by the 1st Cavalry Regiment and the 1st Artillery Regiment, and the stahlhelm only by the NCO School.

This is also the cases on parades held on 18 September, Independence Day, in the local level, whenever Army units take part.

Given the long list of battles fought by the Army, the following wear on parade historical dress uniforms from these times, but not march in the German manner:

 1st Infantry Regiment "Buin" - Grenadier uniform of the 1st Infantry Battalion "Chilean Grenadiers"
 6th Reinforced Regiment "Chacabuco" - War of the Pacific French-styled uniform worn by the 4th Company, in recognition of its heroic final stand in the Battle of La Concepcion
 4th Motorized Infantry Brigade "Rancagua" - War of the Pacific French-styled uniform worn by the Historical Company, similar to those worn by the regiment during the 1880 Battle of Arica
 3rd Cavalry Regiment "Hussars" - black dress uniform with shako worn only by the Demonstration Troop "Cuadro Negro", similar to those worn by its predecessors during the Chilean War of Independence

Military bands 

The Army Band Service is the military band department of the army, operating through the Welfare Command. The massed bands of the capital are known as the Gran Banda de la Guarnición de Santiago (Grand Band of the Santiago Garrison), which is involved every 19 September with the Great Military Parade of Chile. Since its formation up until 1980, it was organized up to 550 musicians. At present, it is made up of approximately 295 musicians, with an attached corps of drums. The main military band in the army is the Concert Band of the Chilean Army. It was founded in 1963, and is the seniormost band in the army, but is more of a concert band, part of its musicians being seconded to the Military Academy. It reports to the current Chief of the Bands Service, Major Jorge Fernando Castro Castro. In 2000, it appeared in Rome on the occasion of the Military Music Jubilee. In 2004 and 2012, it participated in the Quebec City International Festival of Military Bands in Canada. It has also visited Germany, Scotland, Uruguay, France and the United States.

The Chilean Army has two main mounted bands:

 Mounted Band and Bugles of the 1st Cavalry Regiment "Grenadiers"  - It is the seniormost band of the cavalry and armoured regiments of the army
 Band and Bugles of the 3rd Cavalry Regiment "Hussars"

Other bands include the band of the Army NCO School and the Bernardo O'Higgins Military Academy. Military bands in Chile have a Corps of Drums and the Turkish crescent, similarly to German military bands. A distinguishing feature from the German tradition is the presence of the an added Bugle section behind the Corps of Drums, a tradition inherited from France and in the buglers of Imperial Germany, with the band's conductor being assisted by a bugle major who is placed either in front of the bugle section or if in a massed corps of drums behind the buglers.

Commanders-in-chief

See also
 Chilean Navy
 Chilean Air Force
 Lautaro Special Operations Brigade

Notes

References

Bibliography

External links

Official Chilean Army site 

Latin American Light Weapons National Inventories